The Palü Glacier (Romansh: Vadret da Palü) is a 3.5 km long glacier (2005) on the southeastern flank of Piz Palü in the Bernina Range. It belongs to the valley of Poschiavo in the canton of Graubünden. In 1973 it had an area of 6.47 km2.

A lake formed at the bottom of the glacier, at a height of 2,322 metres. Below the glacier lake is another lake, the Lago Palü. Both lakes can be easily reached from the Alp Grüm railway station on the Bernina line.

See also
List of glaciers in Switzerland
List of glaciers
Retreat of glaciers since 1850
Swiss Alps

References

External links
Swiss glacier monitoring network

Glaciers of Graubünden
Glaciers of the Alps
Poschiavo